Siratus motacilla is a species of sea snail, a marine gastropod mollusk in the family Muricidae, the murex snails or rock snails.

Description
The length of the shell attains 39 mm. Its shell colour varies between shades of yellow through pink to a darker red.

This deepwater species can have a considerably extended siphonal canal sometimes accounting for more than half the mollusc's overall length. The mollusc's operculum efficiently seals the aperture completely.

Distribution
This uncommon species has been trapped alive off the West coast of Barbados Lesser Antilles, at depths around 100 m; also off Martinique.

References

  Merle D., Garrigues B. & Pointier J.-P. (2011) Fossil and Recent Muricidae of the world. Part Muricinae. Hackenheim: Conchbooks. 648 pp.
 Houart, R. (2014). Living Muricidae of the world. Muricinae. Murex, Promurex, Haustellum, Bolinus, Vokesimurex and Siratus. Harxheim: ConchBooks. 197 pp.
 Garrigues B. & Lamy D. (2019). Inventaire des Muricidae récoltés au cours de la campagne MADIBENTHOS du MNHN en Martinique (Antilles Françaises) et description de 12 nouvelles espèces des genres Dermomurex, Attilosa, Acanthotrophon, Favartia, Muricopsis et Pygmaepterys (Mollusca, Gastropoda). Xenophora Taxonomy. 23: 22–59.

External links
 Gmelin J.F. (1791). Vermes. In: Gmelin J.F. (Ed.) Caroli a Linnaei Systema Naturae per Regna Tria Naturae, Ed. 13. Tome 1(6). G.E. Beer, Lipsiae 

Muricidae
Gastropods described in 1791